Reid Crawford may refer to:
 H. R. Crawford (1939–2017), American real estate developer and politician from Washington, D.C.
Reid W. Crawford (born 1951), American academic administrator and politician from Iowa